Léa Cousineau was a Canadian politician and a City Councillor in Montreal, Quebec.

RCM Activist

In the early seventies she became a founding member and the President of the progressive Montreal Citizens' Movement, also known as Rassemblement des citoyens et citoyennes de Montréal (RCM) in French.

She ran as an RCM candidate to Montreal's City Council in the district of Rosemont in 1974, but lost against Civic incumbent Jean Trottier.

City Councillor

Cousineau ran again in 1986 in the district of Étienne-Desmarteau and won.  She was re-elected in 1990, but was defeated in 1994.

From 1986 to 1990, she was the Chairperson of Montreal's Executive Committee.

Footnotes

Living people
Montreal city councillors
Women municipal councillors in Canada
Women in Quebec politics
Year of birth missing (living people)